Shobhit University may refer to one of two higher education institutes in Uttar Pradesh, India:

 Shobhit Institute of Engineering & Technology, or Shobhit Deemed University, in Meerut, Meerut district
 Shobhit University (Gangoh), in Gangoh, Saharanpur district